The men's 30 kilometres walk event at the 1978 Commonwealth Games was held on 8 August at the Commonwealth Stadium in Edmonton, Alberta, Canada.

Results

References

Athletics at the 1978 Commonwealth Games
1978